Adulting is a neologism for growing up that became popular on English-speaking social media in the second half of the 2010s. American writer Kelly Williams Brown has been credited with coining the term. The term is commonly used to refer to the context of tasks and activities that are necessary to carry out in order to live and function within mainstream civilized society, but are typically only done by adults due to pragmatic, financial, physical, or legal restrictions rooted in age.

Examples
 Paying yearly taxes
 Paying utility bills
 Shoveling snow
 Jury duty
 Paying monthly mortgage or rent for housing
 Driving/commuting

See also
 Legal age

References

2010s neologisms